The Tholsel on High Street, Kilkenny, Ireland was built in 1761 by Alderman William Colles as place for collecting tolls, but has also been used as a customs house, a courthouse and a guildhall. It is used today as the city hall, and this is the name by which many local people know the building.

Key features of the building are the open arcade on the ground floor, which straddles the pavement; the copper-clad octagonal tower projecting from the hipped slate roof; the clock, and the tower's viewing platform. On the southern façade is a relief sculpture of the town coat of arms. The Tholsel commands a central position on High Street and contributes significantly to the street's unique character.

The Tholsel's arcade is an ideal place for carol singers or buskers to perform, and is a traditional meeting point, acting as a covered piazza. It is used as a temporary exhibition space during Kilkenny's annual Arts Week and at Christmas time it traditionally houses the Christmas Crib.

On 20 September 1985 the Tholsel was gutted by fire. That evening, fireman Joe Stapleton was completing his duties as the Town Sergeant when he discovered a fire on the upper floor of the building. He called the fire service, opened the main gates for the fire tenders and brought the 17th-century charters of the city to safety. It took 35 firemen and six fire engines to fight this fire, which was started by a small electrical fault.

References

Further reading

External links
Archiseek
Buildings of Ireland
Tholsel on Kilkenny.ie
A photo of the Tholsel
A collection of images of the Tholsel at Christmas

Buildings and structures in County Kilkenny
Tourist attractions in County Kilkenny
Buildings and structures in Kilkenny (city)
Government buildings completed in 1761
Government buildings in the Republic of Ireland
Guildhalls in Ireland